Marshallville is a city in Macon County, Georgia, United States. The population was 1,048 at the 2020 census, down from 1,448 in 2010.

History
Marshallville was founded in the 1820s. It was incorporated as a town in 1854 and as a city in 1953.

Geography
Marshallville is in northeastern Macon County. Georgia State Routes 49 and 127 pass through the city. SR 49 leads southwest  to Montezuma, the largest city in the county, and north  to Fort Valley. SR 127 goes southwest out of town with SR 49 but then leads west   to Rupert, while to the east it leads  to Perry.

Demographics

2020 census

As of the 2020 United States census, there were 1,048 people, 560 households, and 309 families residing in the city.

2000 census
As of the census of 2000, there were 1,335 people, 523 households, and 365 families residing in the city. The racial makeup of the city was 20.82% White, 78.43% African American, 0.30% Native American, 0.15% from other races, and 0.30% from two or more races. Hispanic or Latino of any race were 0.45% of the population.

There were 523 households, out of which 29.4% had children under the age of 18 living with them, 30.2% were married couples living together, 35.0% had a female householder with no husband present, and 30.2% were non-families. 28.9% of all households were made up of individuals, and 14.5% had someone living alone who was 65 years of age or older.  The average household size was 2.55 and the average family size was 3.13.

In the city, the population was spread out, with 27.1% under the age of 18, 11.4% from 18 to 24, 22.7% from 25 to 44, 24.9% from 45 to 64, and 13.9% who were 65 years of age or older.  The median age was 36 years. For every 100 females, there were 80.4 males.  For every 100 females age 18 and over, there were 74.4 males.

The median income for a household in the city was $21,800, and the median income for a family was $24,375. Males had a median income of $27,557 versus $20,167 for females. The per capita income for the city was $11,306.  About 27.1% of families and 29.5% of the population were below the poverty line, including 44.7% of those under age 18 and 30.1% of those age 65 or over.

References

External links

Cities in Georgia (U.S. state)
Cities in Macon County, Georgia